Cumbernauld Colts Football Club is a football team from Cumbernauld, Scotland which was formed in 1969.

The senior team competed in the Caledonian Amateur Football League with the club eventually entering the Lowland Football League in 2015.

History 
Colts were formed in 1969, and had success as a youth football club in the 70s and 80s, helping develop young footballers such as future Scotland internationals Derek Whyte, Jackie McNamara and Dougie Bell.

The club had a period of decline in the '90s, due to several of its teams disbanding. It was re-branded in 1999, and built its way back up.

In 2015, the club was awarded full membership of the Scottish FA and was elected to the SLFL.

Ground

Colts currently play at the all-seated Broadwood Stadium, currently ground-sharing with fellow Lowland Football League side Broomhill.

Current squad
As of 11 March 2022

Coaching staff
Manager: David Proctor
Assistant manager: Darren Dods
Coach: Kevin Proctor
Goalkeeping coach:	Lee Hollis
 Physio: Connor Scott

Season-by-season record

Lowland League

† Season curtailed due to coronavirus pandemic

Honours
Lowland League Cup
Winners: 2017–18
SFA South Region Challenge Cup
Runners-up: 2016–17

References

External links
Official website

Cumbernauld
Football clubs in Scotland
Football in North Lanarkshire
Lowland Football League teams
Association football clubs established in 1969
1969 establishments in Scotland